Vinícius Hollweg Flores (born ), better known as Vini, is a Brazilian futsal player who plays as a pivot for Campo Mourão and the Brazilian national futsal team.

References

External links
Liga Nacional de Futsal profile
The Final Ball profile

1984 births
Living people
Brazilian men's futsal players